The Voyager Golden Record contains 116 images and a variety of sounds. The items for the record, which is carried on both the Voyager 1 and Voyager 2 spacecraft, were selected for NASA by a committee chaired by Carl Sagan of Cornell University. Included are natural sounds (including some made by animals), musical selections from different cultures and eras, spoken greetings in 59 languages, human sounds like footsteps and laughter, and printed messages from President Jimmy Carter and U.N. Secretary-General Kurt Waldheim.

Greetings 
The first audio section contains a spoken greeting in English from then-Secretary-General of the United Nations Kurt Waldheim.

The second audio section ("Greetings in 55 Languages") contains spoken greetings in 55 languages. The original plan was to use greetings made by United Nations delegates, but various problems with these recordings led to new recordings being made at Cornell University by people from the foreign-language departments. The number of native speakers of these 55 languages combined (excluding L2 speakers) is over 4.7 billion people, comprising over 65% of the world population. It includes four Chinese varieties (marked with **), 12 South Asian languages (marked #) and five ancient languages (marked §), listed here in alphabetical order:

Later audio sections contain the spoken greetings by the United Nations delegates in the remaining four languages, including Esperanto and !Kung. The whale sounds were provided by Roger Payne.

This is a list of the recorded greetings in order of appearance on their respective tracks.

Sounds 
The next audio section is devoted to the "sounds of Earth" that include:

 "Music of the Spheres" – Johannes Kepler's Harmonices Mundi realized by Laurie Spiegel
 Volcanoes, Earthquake, Thunder
 Mud Pots
 Wind, Rain, Surf
 Crickets, Frogs
 Birds, Hyena, Elephant, Whale
 Chimpanzee
 Wind
 Wild Dog
 Footsteps, Heartbeat, Laughter (Sagan's)
 The First Tools

 Tame Dog
 Herding Sheep, Blacksmith, Sawing
 Tractor, Riveter
 Morse Code, Ships (precisely, a ship's horn)
 Horse and Cart
 Train (specifically the whistle of a steam locomotive)
 Tractor, Bus, Auto
 F-111 Flyby, Saturn V Lift-off (Apollo 15)
 Kiss, Mother and Child
 Life Signs, Pulsar

Included within the Sounds of Earth audio portion of the Golden Record is a track containing the inspirational message per aspera ad astra in Morse code. Translated from Latin, it means 'through hardships to the stars.'

Brainwaves 
The life signs included on the record were an hour-long recording of the heartbeat and brainwaves of Ann Druyan, who would later marry Carl Sagan. The hour-long recording was compressed into the span of a minute to be able to fit into the essay. In the epilogue of the 1997 book Billions and Billions, she describes the experience:

On February 12, 2010, an interview with Ann Druyan was aired on NPR during which the above was explained in more detail.

Music
Following the section on the sounds of Earth, there is an eclectic 90-minute selection of music from many cultures, including Eastern and Western classics. The selections include:

It has been claimed that Sagan had originally asked for permission to include "Here Comes the Sun" from the Beatles' album Abbey Road; but while the Beatles favored it, EMI opposed it and the song was not included. However, this has been refuted by Timothy Ferris, who worked on the selection with Sagan; he said the song was never even considered for inclusion.

Images 
Along with the audio, the record contains a collection of 116 pictures (one of which is for calibration) detailing but not limited to human life on Earth and the planet itself. Many pictures are annotated with one or many indications of scales of time, size or mass. Some images also contain indications of chemical composition. All measures used on the pictures are first defined in the first few images using physical references.

Following is a list of all the images contained in the Voyager Golden Record together with a description of the nature of the image and what annotations were included in them, and when copyright permits, the actual image.

After NASA had received criticism over the nudity on the Pioneer plaque (line drawings of a naked man and woman), the agency chose not to allow Sagan and his colleagues to include George Hester's photograph of a nude man and woman on the record. Instead, only a silhouette of the couple was included.

An official statement by President Jimmy Carter was included as images (positions 117, 118). It reads, in part:This Voyager spacecraft was constructed by the United States of America. We are a community of 240 million human beings among the more than 4 billion who inhabit the planet Earth. We human beings are still divided into nation states, but these states are rapidly becoming a global civilization.

We cast this message into the cosmos ... It is likely to survive a billion years into our future, when our civilization is profoundly altered and the surface of the Earth may be vastly changed. Of the 200 billion stars in the Milky Way galaxy, some – perhaps many – may have inhabited planets and space faring civilizations. If one such civilization intercepts Voyager and can understand these recorded contents, here is our message: This is a present from a small distant world, a token of our sounds, our science, our images, our music, our thoughts, and our feelings. We are attempting to survive our time so we may live into yours. We hope some day, having solved the problems we face, to join a community of galactic civilizations. This record represents our hope and our determination and our goodwill in a vast and awesome universe.

See also 
 Communication with extraterrestrial intelligence

Notes and references 
Notes

References

External links 

 Official NASA JPL page about the Golden Record
 Multimedia showcase with the contents of the Golden Record
 The Infinite Voyager : The Golden Record – built by Lily Bui from MIT
 Voyager 1 Audio on Internet Archive
 Official Nasa Soundcloud page with sounds from Golden Record
 Multimedia presentation of the images and audio of the Golden Records

 
Voyager program

es:Disco de oro de las Voyager